The 2009 All-Pro Team consists of National Football League (NFL) players named to the Associated Press (AP), Pro Football Writers Association (PFWA), and Sporting News All-Pro teams in the 2009 NFL season.  The Associated Press and Sporting News named first and second-team selections. The AP team was selected by a national panel of 50 NFL writers. The Sporting News selection process consisted of a players' poll, making it "The Players' All-Pro Team". The PFWA All-NFL team is based on a poll of its more than 300 members.

Teams

Only the AP designates fullbacks.
The Sporting News groups all linebackers together and names three total, the PFWA names two outside and one inside (middle) linebacker (as in a 4-3 defense), while the AP designates two outside and two inside linebackers.
Cushing was originally named as a second-team outside linebacker by the AP along with Lamar Woodley.  When it was disclosed several months after the voting was completed that he had failed a drug test administered during the season the AP decided to re-open voting at the position.  Cushing was named on only one ballot in the re-vote, down from 5 votes he originally received.  James Harrison and Lance Briggs replaced Cushing.
The AP does not designate a punt returner.
Only PFWA designates a special teams player.

Key
 AP = Associated Press first-team All-Pro
 AP-2 = Associated Press second-team All-Pro
 PFWA = Pro Football Writers Association All-NFL
 SN = Sporting News All-Pro
 SN-2 = Sporting News All-Pro second-team

References

2009 AP All-Pro Team voting
Sporting News 2009 All-Pro team offense
 Sporting News 2009 All-Pro team defense
Manning, Woodson lead PFWA All-NFL team
Pro Football Weekly, January 24, 2010. Volume 24, Issue 28. pg 14.

All-Pro Teams
Allpro